Christy Prior (born 28 November 1988) is a snowboarder from New Zealand. Born in Okehampton, Devon, UK, she competed for New Zealand at the 2014 Winter Olympics in Sochi.

After qualifying for the semifinals of the snowboard slopestyle, she withdrew from the event following a crash in practice.

In January 2015 she won the bronze medal at the Winter X Games XIX in Aspen, and the gold medal in slopestyle at the Burton European Open in Laxx.

Competition History
1st place Burton European Open Slopestyle 2015
Winter X Games 2015 Bronze Slopestyle
2014 3rd place Overall FIS World Snowboard Slopestyle Ranking
1st place Stoneham World Cup 2014
1st place TTR 5-star Community Cup Slopestyle 2014
Ms. Superpark MVP 2013
Ms. Superpark Standout 2013
2nd place Burton High Fives 2012

References

External links 
 
 
 
 

1988 births
Living people
New Zealand female snowboarders
Snowboarders at the 2014 Winter Olympics
Olympic snowboarders of New Zealand
People from Okehampton
New Zealand people of British descent
X Games athletes